Nilavu : English: Moonlight) is a 2010 Malayalam romantic film written and directed by Ajith Nair. Nilavu is the soul touching story of an indefinable relationship between two lonely individuals, who meet by chance. The whole film revolves around the strange bond that develops between them and how their relationship evolves. Krishnan Haridas as 'Hari' and Sunita Nedungadi as 'Lakshmi' bring to life the emotional complexities of expatriate life in the Persian Gulf region.

Plot
Hari is the protagonist of Nilavu, caught in the solitude of his own emotional disconnect. It is a journey that has led him away from the lush green, simple environs of his native Kerala to the lonesome, lost world of people brought together in a strange land, living in the shadows of synthetic dreams. Nilavu unfolds as a poignant story of the expatriate migrant workers in the Persian Gulf countries.

Lakshmi, the other protagonist, is a nature lover, married to a rich businessperson, living in Bahrain. Lakshmi enjoys all the material luxuries that money can buy, yet feels lonesome and lost in a strange land of glass and concrete, caged in a dysfunctional relationship.

The magic of Nilavu is thus woven around the lives of Hari and Lakshmi and the solitude that brings them together, each searching for an emotional anchor. How their relationship evolves and where it leads to forms the core of Nilavu's journey, exploring human emotions and the different shades of love, perception and belief.

Krishnan Haridas as ‘Hari’ and Sunita Sunil Nedungnadi as ‘Lakshmi’ bring to life the emotional complexities of expatriate life in the Arab states of the Persian Gulf. Delving deep into the psyche of the Indian community, Nilavu, through a strong supporting cast, captures the dreams, desires and aspirations of the migrant workers and families as well as the cultural ethos of the region.

Cast
 Ramu
Nandhu
 Krishnan Haridas as Hari
 Sunitha Nedungadi as Lakshmi
 Sreelekha as Jyothy
 Prasanth as Jayashanker
 Sangeetha as Gowri
 Subier Shams as Raju
 Suresh as Teacher
 Karunakaran Suresh as Mr. Nair
 Remesh as Remu
 Rejith Menon as Deepu

Soundtrack

References
 name= Nilavu The Hindu
 
 Nilavu Gulf Daily News
 Daily Tribune News
 name= മലയാള മനോരമ - നിലാവ്

2010 films
2010s Malayalam-language films
Films set in Bahrain